Penicillium kloeckeri is an anamorph species of the genus of Penicillium.

References

Further reading

 
 
 
 

kloeckeri
Fungi described in 1979